The Shadow (Italian:L'ombra) is a 1920 Italian silent film directed by Roberto Roberti and starring Francesca Bertini.

Cast
In alphabetical order
 Francesca Bertini 
 Ferruccio Biancini 
 Maria Caserini
 Mary Fleuron 
 Amleto Novelli 
 Gabriel Rosca 
 Domenico Serra

References

Bibliography
 Cristina Jandelli. Le dive italiane del cinema muto. L'epos, 2006.

External links

1920 films
1920s Italian-language films
Films directed by Roberto Roberti
Italian silent feature films
Italian black-and-white films